Garjiya Devi Temple is a noted Devi temple located in the Garjiya village near Ramnagar, Uttarakhand, India, on the outskirts of the Corbett National Park. It is a sacred Shakti shrine where Garjiya Devi is the presiding deity. The temple is situated over a large rock in the Kosi River and is one of the most famous temples of the Nainital district, visited by thousands of devotees during Kartik Poornima, a Hindu holy day celebrated on the fifteenth lunar day of Kartik (November – December)
The first priest was Pt. Keshav Dutt Pandey who began worship of Devi Girija. There is also a statue of LakshmiNarayan of 9th century, made from black granite. Many people from nearby areas go there every day to worship in the temple. Many people bathe in the Kosi river near Garjiya temple.

Festivals
The temple is also known as the festival of lights of the gods. The Kartik Purnima festival also coincides with the Sikh festival of Guru Nanak Jayanti.

See also
 List of Hindu festivals

References

External links
 Garjiya Devi Temple - thedivineindia.com
 Garjiya Devi Temple

Hindu temples in Uttarakhand
Devi temples in India
Nainital district